Nicholas John Cunliffe-Lister, 3rd Earl of Swinton (4 September 1939 – 21 March 2021), styled Nicholas Cunliffe-Lister from 1974 to 2006, was a British peer.

The younger grandson of the first Earl, he became Earl of Swinton on the death of his older brother, the 2nd Earl, on 26 March 2006. Their father, Major Hon. John Yarburgh Cunliffe-Lister, the son and heir of Philip Cunliffe-Lister, 1st Earl of Swinton, had been killed in action in 1943.


Family
Swinton's first wife was the Hon. Elizabeth Susan Whitelaw, eldest daughter of the 1st Viscount Whitelaw, whom he married in 1966.  She was appointed Lord Lieutenant of the East Riding of Yorkshire in July 2005.

He had two sons and one daughter by his first wife:

 Lady Lorna Mary Cunliffe-Lister (born 1968) married 2001 to William Parker.
 Mark William Philip Cunliffe-Lister, styled Lord Masham (born 15 September 1970), who has been married since 17 June 2000 to Felicity C. Shadbolt. The couple have bought back and restored Swinton Park.  They have two sons and one daughter.
 Hon. Simon Charles Cunliffe-Lister (born 1977), now of Burton Agnes Hall

Before he became Lord Swinton, Cunliffe-Lister and Susan Whitelaw divorced, and in 1996 he married secondly Pamela June Wood, the former wife of Jeremy Sykes, of the Sykes family of Sledmere.

Swinton died in March 2021 at the age of 81. He was succeeded in the earldom by his eldest son, the Honourable Mark William Philip Cunliffe-Lister, previously styled Lord Masham.

References

External links 
2nd Earl of Swinton, DL (1937-2006) – Google Peerage News Group
Genealogy
Announcement of his succession at the House of Lords

Cunliffe-Lister, Nicholas John
Cunliffe-Lister, Nicholas John
Swinton, Nicholas John Cunliffe-Lister, 3rd Earl
3
People from Masham